Olga Lvovna Sviblova (Russian: Ольга Львовна Свиблова, born on June 6, 1953 in Moscow, USSR) is a Russian curator, film director, and arts administrator. In 1996, she founded the Moscow House of Photography, which later became the Multimedia Art Museum, Moscow; she has been a director there since the institution's establishment.

Life and career 
A graduate of Moscow State University with majors in psychology, she has later pursued a Ph. D. researching psychology in arts. In 1970s, she took a job as a street sweeper, to have, in her own words, "a job for intelligent people". In the 1980s, she created a number of documentaries, earning her prominence both in the USSR, and internationally. The first exhibition she organized was in 1987, when she arranged for a showcase of emerging Soviet artists. Over a career spanning three decades, she has curated more than five hundred exhibitions of contemporary visual art and photography in Russia, and internationally.

In 2007 and in 2009, she was the curator of the national pavilion of Russia at the Venice Biennale.

Selected awards 
 Order of Friendship (2007), Russia
 Chevalier, and Officer of Legion d'Honeur (2008, 2017), France
 Order of Merit (2011), Italy

References

Further reading 

 

Directors of museums in Russia
Women museum directors
Curators from Moscow
Living people
1953 births
Soviet art historians
Russian art historians
Commanders of the Order of Merit of the Italian Republic
Officiers of the Légion d'honneur
Recipients of the Medal of the Order "For Merit to the Fatherland" II class
Academic staff of Moscow State University
Members of the Civic Chamber of the Russian Federation
Photography critics
Full Members of the Russian Academy of Arts
Russian art curators
Russian women curators
Russian women historians